Charles William Goddard (November 26, 1879 – January 11, 1951) was an American playwright and screenwriter.

Goddard began writing Broadway plays before turning to film, adapting a number of his stage works to film. He wrote the script for the Pathé Freres film The Exploits of Elaine, which has been selected for preservation in the United States National Film Registry.

He was born in Portland, Maine and died in Miami, Florida. He is interred in Evergreen Cemetery in Portland, Maine.

Plays

Broadway plays 
The Misleading Lady (1913)
The Ghost Breaker (1914)
Miss Information (1915)
The Last Laugh (1915)
The Broken Wing (1920)

Screenplays 
The Perils of Pauline (1914)
The Exploits of Elaine (1914)
The Ghost Breaker (1914)
The New Adventures of J. Rufus Wallingford (1915)
The Goddess (1915)
Hearts of Three (1916; later novelized by Jack London)
The Misleading Lady (1916)
The Mysteries of Myra (1916)
The Hidden Hand (1917)
Patria (1917) 
The Lightning Raider (1919)
The Hope Diamond Mystery (1921)
The Broken Wing (1932)

External links 

 
 
 

1879 births
1951 deaths
20th-century American dramatists and playwrights
American male screenwriters
Writers from Portland, Maine
Burials at Evergreen Cemetery (Portland, Maine)
American male dramatists and playwrights
20th-century American male writers
Screenwriters from Maine
20th-century American screenwriters